Harry Allison Johnston II (December 2, 1931 – June 28, 2021) was an American lawyer, politician and diplomat from Florida. He was a member of the United States House of Representatives and was a member of the Democratic Party.

Early life and career
Johnston was born in West Palm Beach, Florida. He attended the Virginia Military Institute, and he became a lieutenant in the United States Army after graduating. Once he was discharged, he entered the University of Florida and earned his law degree.

In 1974, Johnston was elected to the Florida Senate. With the Democrats in control of the body in the 1980s, Johnston rose to the rank of President of the Senate. In 1986, he sought the Democratic nomination for Governor of Florida, but lost in a close primary race.

Congress
Johnston was elected to Congress in 1988. He served four terms in the House before his retirement in 1997.

Later career
In 1999 President Bill Clinton appointed him to serve as the United States Special Envoy for Sudan. A position he held until 2000.

He was an attorney at the West Palm Beach law firm of Jones, Foster, Johnston & Stubbs, P.A. until his retirement from practicing law.

He served on the District Board of Trustees at Palm Beach State College from 1997 to 1999.

Johnston died on June 28, 2021, aged 89, more than a decade after being diagnosed with Alzheimer's disease.

References

External links
 
 

1931 births
2021 deaths
20th-century American lawyers
20th-century American politicians
Democratic Party members of the United States House of Representatives from Florida
Florida lawyers
Democratic Party Florida state senators
Fredric G. Levin College of Law alumni
Military personnel from Florida
People from West Palm Beach, Florida
Presidents of the Florida Senate
United States Army officers
Virginia Military Institute alumni
Deaths from Alzheimer's disease